The New Jersey Conservative Party, formerly abbreviated as the NJCP, now as CP-NJ, is a conservative political party in New Jersey, United States.

Ideology
The NJCP advocates for low taxes, a balanced budget and job growth, the right to own private property, limiting welfare to individuals, ending government-supported health care, and limiting foreign aid. It favors states' rights, a strong military, anti-immigration laws, and term limits for congressmen. It supports a national holiday for Election Day.

Membership
According to the New Jersey Division of Elections (part of the New Jersey Department of State), 
there were 154 registered Conservative Party members statewide on October 20, 2008. Membership in the party grew five-fold in 2015-2016; as of March 2016, there were 814 registered members, and by November 2016, there were 3,516. Membership grew again in 2018; in February there were 7,371 registered voters, and as of July 2018, there were 8,447.

As of February 2019, there are 10,610 registered members.

History

1963 New Jersey elections
In the 1963 election for New Jersey Assembly a number of candidates ran as "Conservative" in Essex and Bergen counties as part of a nationwide split in the Republican party which saw northeastern states, like New Jersey, have their state Republican party be dominated by the party's liberal faction. These Conservative candidates opposed the social liberal policies of the Dwight D. Eisenhower administration in favor of the more social conservative school of though emerging with Senator Barry Goldwater. This party split would end following the 1964 United States presidential election and its 1964 Republican National Convention which effectively saw the Goldwater wing of the party dominate. These candidates have no relation to the party founded in 1992, but where listed under the same name on the ballot.

1992 party
The New Jersey Conservative Party was created in 1992 by Tom Blomquist, who had run as candidate for Governor of New Jersey in the 1989 as a Republican getting 0.98% of the vote in the primary, and in 1993 gubernatorial elections as a Conservative.

The NJCP received the endorsement of United We Stand America, H. Ross Perot's citizen action organization in 1995. In 1995, the party ran approximately 60 candidates for the New Jersey General Assembly, none of whom won. the party broke the record for the most third party candidates during one election in the history of New Jersey. This helped lead the NJCP to receiving 117,219 votes. However, in order to earn official third-party status from the state, the party was required to bring in at least 10% of the total vote; a number it did not meet. The party considered changing its name in support of Perot's presidential candidacy.

In 1997, the Conservative Party and other members of the Council of Alternative Political Parties filed suit against the state regarding filing deadlines and the number of signatures needed to do so.

The party ran candidates in every district in New Jersey in the midterm 1998 United States House of Representatives elections.

In 1999,  New Jersey Conservative Party and three of its individual members who were candidates for elective office filed a certified complaint to enjoin county clerks, from drawing separate political party columns for the Democratic and Republican parties on the official ballot. The party also brought an appeal to the Supreme Court of New Jersey regarding preferential ballot positions for the Republican and Democratic parties compared to the NJCP. Historically, the Republican and Democratic candidates were given top spots on the ballot, and the NJCP argued that low voter turn-out led to these parties not even receiving the 10% vote minimum (out of all registered voters for that cycle) to proceed to the general vote. However, the court ruled to reject the application.

In 2000, the New Jersey Conservative Party was involved in a lawsuit that permitted New Jersey voters to join third parties. Until 2001 New Jersey did not allow registering to vote as anything other than Democrat, Republican, or Independent. This was ruled unconstitutional in 2001 after a lawsuit was brought by a coalition of political parties, including the NJCP.

In 2009 the State Chairman Stephen Spinosa asked registered members to change their party affiliation to Republican so they could vote for Steve Lonegan for Governor. (Spinosa had run for office as NJCP candidate, twice for State and once for Congress between 1997 and 1999). By doing so he  effectively called for the suspension, though not dissolution, of his third-party movement in order to boost Lonegan's chances.

On February 19, 2010, the New Jersey Conservative Party signed an affiliation agreement with the national Conservative Party USA. By February 20, the New Jersey affiliate turned over their party membership to the national party for management in accordance with the affiliation agreement. Dr. Steven Maness (who had run as Conservative Party candidate for Middlesex County Freeholder in 1998) assumed New Jersey party leadership on December 30.

In January 2019, Martin Marks, former mayor of Scotch Plains, alongside Harris Pappas, announced their independent candidacy for the New Jersey's 21st Legislative District, under the banner of "Conservative" in the 2019 New Jersey elections. Both would go on to lose handily with 1.05% and 0.99% respectively.

See also
 Conservatism in the United States
 Conservative Party of New York
 Political party strength in New Jersey

References

External links
 New Jersey Conservative Party Home Page

Political parties established in 1992
Defunct state and local conservative parties in the United States
Conservative Party
Regional and state political parties in the United States
1992 establishments in New Jersey